Thomas Barbour (1884–1946) was an American herpetologist.

Thomas Barbour may also refer to:

Thomas Barbour (MP), for Wareham, 1395
Thomas Barbour (Virginia politician) (1735–1825), American landowner and member of the Virginia House of Burgesses
Tommy Barbour (1887–1967), Scottish footballer
Thomas Barbour (actor), American actor appearing in The Taking of Pelham One Two Three (1974) and Arthur (1981)